Harvey School District 152 is a school district headquartered in Harvey, Illinois near Chicago.

Schools
Secondary schools
 Brooks Middle School
Elementary schools
 Maya Angelou Elementary School
 Bryant Elementary School
 Holmes Elementary School
 Lowell-Longfellow Elementary School (closed 2017)
 Carl Sandburg Elementary School
 Whittier Elementary School
Pre-K
 Riley Early Childhood Center

References

External links

 

School districts in Cook County, Illinois